The King Valley, or King River Valley is a wine-producing and agricultural region centred on the King River between Wangaratta and the Alpine National Park in the North East Victoria zone of the Australian state of Victoria. There are a number of small towns within the region including Cheshunt, Whitfield, King Valley, Edi, Claremont, Moyhu, Byrne, Docker and Oxley. King Valley was recorded as an Australian Geographical Indication protected name on 12 October 2007.

History
The fertile valley area has been used since the 1880s to grow a variety of crops including hops and tobacco alongside dairy and beef cattle production. A narrow-gauge railway was built between Wangaratta and Whitfield in 1889 and a government tobacco research farm was established in Edi and moved to Whitfield in 1902. Following the end of World War II, a large number of Italian, Yugoslav and Spanish migrants settled in the area and established tobacco farms.  Following the decline of the tobacco industry in the mid 80s to its demise in 2006 from government deregulation, local farmers branched out into other crops such as chestnuts, hops and berries and a number of vineyards were established.

The King Valley has a history which includes bushrangers, Chinese and Italian immigration. The Chinese migrants came from the Goldfields in the mid-19th century and began careers as market gardeners, tobacco growers and merchants. Many roads in the Valley today carry the names of the more prominent families like Mahlooks, Honey, Laffy and Fosangs. Italian migrants came to the region in the 1940s and 1950s, and similarly began tobacco farming however, they would eventually switch to producing European wine varietals. The Valley eventually gained a reputation as a wine region for sangiovese, nebbiolo and barbera varieties amongst others.

The Whitfield railway line operated in the King Valley from 1899 to 1953. One of four narrow gauge lines of the Victorian Railways, the 50-kilometre line operated from Wangaratta (where it connected with the North East railway line) to Whitfield. Today, this route is a rail trail.

Whitfield and Moyhu are the major townships in the King Valley along the road from Wangaratta or Mansfield. The two towns Serve as major tourism centers within the Valley along with the smaller hamlets are dotted throughout the King Valley region.

References

External links
Australian Places - Cheshunt  Moyhu  Oxley Whitfield
Wangaratta to Whitfield Railway

Wine regions of Victoria (Australia)
Wangaratta